Mudon Township is a township of Mawlamyine District in the Mon State of Myanmar.

It is the birthplace of student activist Min Ko Naing. Activist, Pe Thein Zar, was born in  Kamawet Village, about 15km south of Mudon.

Townships of Mon State